The Van Wezel Performing Arts Hall is a performing arts venue located at 777 North Tamiami Trail, Sarasota, Florida neighboring the Sarasota Bay. The main theater of the  facility contains 1,741 seats.

History
The initial construction of the 1,736-seat hall was partly funded by a bequest from local residents Lewis and Eugenia van Wezel, who donated $400,000 of the total construction cost of $2.5 million.

The architectural design was carried out by William Wesley Peters, of Taliesin Associated Architects, who used seashells as inspiration for the design.

The purple and lavender color scheme was suggested by Frank Lloyd Wright's widow, Olgivanna Lloyd Wright.

The Henry C. Beck Company was general contractor for construction of the hall.

Foundation Controversy 
The Van Wezel Foundation was formed in 1987 to support the operations of the performing hall. Then in 2019, the foundation changed its name to the Sarasota Performing Arts Center Foundation, Inc. In addition to supporting the arts education initiatives, the foundation is also raising funds to construct a new performing arts center.

While continuing to operate under its old "Van Wezel" name, the new foundation actively promoted the new hall while denigrating the still functioning hall. This campaign was considered deceptive by the namesake Van Wezel family resulting in a cease and desist request.

References

External links 
 Van Wezel Performing Arts Hall

Concert halls in Florida
Buildings and structures in Sarasota, Florida
Tourist attractions in Sarasota County, Florida
Theatres in Florida
Theatres completed in 1969